The National Parliamentary Organisation was a political party in Burma.

History
The party was formed in order to contest the 1928 elections. It won five seats, and joined the People's Party bloc in the Legislative Council. Following the elections, the NPO merged into the People's Party.

References

Defunct political parties in Myanmar